Lošonec is a village and municipality of Trnava District in the Trnava region of Slovakia.

References

External links
https://web.archive.org/web/20070427022352/http://www.statistics.sk/mosmis/eng/run.html
http://www.losonec.com/ - official web page
 private web page

Villages and municipalities in Trnava District